Jack Harrington may refer to:
 Jack Harrington (Australian footballer)
 Jack Harrington (English footballer)